Monoon is a genus of plants in the family Annonaceae and the tribe Miliuseae. 
Species have been recorded from the Indian subcontinent, Indo-China, Malesia, New Guinea and Australia, with introductions in West Africa.  A number of species have been moved here from the genus Polyalthia.

Species 

Plants of the World Online currently includes:

 Monoon acuminatum  (Thwaites) B.Xue & R.M.K.Saunders
 Monoon amischocarpum  (I.M.Turner) B.Xue & R.M.K.Saunders
 Monoon anomalum  (Becc.) B.Xue & R.M.K.Saunders
 Monoon asteriellum  (Ridl.) B.Xue & R.M.K.Saunders
 Monoon australe  (Benth.) B.Xue & R.M.K.Saunders
 Monoon barnesii  (Merr.) B.Xue & R.M.K.Saunders
 Monoon bathrantherum  I.M.Turner
 Monoon bemban  Miq.
 Monoon borneense  (H.Okada) B.Xue & R.M.K.Saunders
 Monoon brevipedunculatum  (Boerl.) B.Xue & R.M.K.Saunders
 Monoon chloranthum  (K.Schum. & Lauterb.) B.Xue & R.M.K.Saunders
 Monoon chloroxanthum  Miq.
 Monoon coffeoides  (Thwaites ex Hook.f. & Thomson) B.Xue & R.M.K.Saunders
 Monoon congestum  (Ridl.) B.Xue & R.M.K.Saunders
 Monoon congregatum  (King) B.Xue & R.M.K.Saunders
 Monoon coriaceum  (Ridl.) B.Xue & R.M.K.Saunders
 Monoon costigerum  Miq.
 Monoon cratiense  (Bân) B.Xue & R.M.K.Saunders
 Monoon cupulare  (King) B.Xue & R.M.K.Saunders
 Monoon daclacense  (Bân) B.Xue & R.M.K.Saunders
 Monoon elongatum  (Merr.) B.Xue & R.M.K.Saunders
 Monoon erianthoides  (Airy Shaw) B.Xue & R.M.K.Saunders
 Monoon fragrans  (Dalzell) B.Xue & R.M.K.Saunders
 Monoon fuscum  (King) B.Xue & R.M.K.Saunders
 Monoon gigantifolium  (Merr.) B.Xue & R.M.K.Saunders
 Monoon glabrum  (Hook.f. & Thomson) B.Xue & R.M.K.Saunders
 Monoon grandiflorum  (Becc.) B.Xue & R.M.K.Saunders
 Monoon grandifolium  (Elmer) B.Xue & R.M.K.Saunders
 Monoon harmandii  (Pierre) B.Xue & R.M.K.Saunders
 Monoon hookerianum  (King) B.Xue & R.M.K.Saunders
 Monoon hypogaeum  (King) B.Xue & R.M.K.Saunders
 Monoon jucundum  (Pierre) B.Xue & R.M.K.Saunders
 Monoon kingii  (Baker f.) B.Xue & R.M.K.Saunders
 Monoon klemmei  (Elmer) B.Xue & R.M.K.Saunders
 Monoon lateriflorum  (Blume) Miq. - type species
 Monoon laui  (Merr.) B.Xue & R.M.K.Saunders
 Monoon liukiuense  (Hatus.) B.Xue & R.M.K.Saunders
 Monoon longifolium  (Sonn.) B.Xue & R.M.K.Saunders
 Monoon longipes  Miq.
 Monoon macranthum  (King) B.Xue & R.M.K.Saunders
 Monoon magnoliiflorum  (Maingay ex Hook.f. & Thomson) B.Xue & R.M.K.Saunders
 Monoon malayanum  I.M.Turner & Utteridge
 Monoon membranifolium  (J.Sinclair) B.Xue & R.M.K.Saunders
 Monoon merguiense  (Chatterjee) B.Xue & R.M.K.Saunders
 Monoon merrillii  (Kaneh.) I.M.Turner & Utteridge
 Monoon michaelii  (C.T.White) B.Xue & R.M.K.Saunders
 Monoon mindanaense  (Elmer) B.Xue & R.M.K.Saunders
 Monoon namkadingense  Soulad. & Tagane
 Monoon nitidum  (A.DC.) I.M.Turner
 Monoon oblongifolium  (C.B.Rob.) B.Xue & R.M.K.Saunders
 Monoon obtusum  (Craib) B.Xue & R.M.K.Saunders
 Monoon oligocarpum  Miq.
 Monoon pachypetalum  I.M.Turner & Utteridge
 Monoon pachyphyllum  (King) B.Xue & R.M.K.Saunders
 Monoon paradoxum  (Becc.) B.Xue & R.M.K.Saunders
 Monoon patinatum  (Jessup) B.Xue & R.M.K.Saunders
 Monoon polycarpum  (Burck) B.Xue & R.M.K.Saunders
 Monoon praestigiosum  (J.Sinclair) B.Xue & R.M.K.Saunders
 Monoon ramiflorum  (Merr.) B.Xue & R.M.K.Saunders
 Monoon salomonicum  I.M.Turner & Utteridge
 Monoon sclerophyllum  (Hook.f. & Thomson) B.Xue & R.M.K.Saunders
 Monoon shendurunii  (Basha & Sasidh.) B.Xue & R.M.K.Saunders
 Monoon simiarum  (Buch.-Ham. ex Hook.f. & Thomson) B.Xue & R.M.K.Saunders
 Monoon sublanceolatum  Miq.
 Monoon sympetalum  (Merr.) B.Xue & R.M.K.Saunders
 Monoon thorelii  (Pierre) B.Xue & R.M.K.Saunders
 Monoon tirunelveliense  (M.B.Viswan. & Manik.) B.Xue & R.M.K.Saunders
 Monoon vietnamensis  N.S.Lý
 Monoon viride  (Craib) B.Xue & R.M.K.Saunders
 Monoon xanthopetalum  (Merr.) B.Xue & R.M.K.Saunders
 Monoon zamboangaense  (Merr.) B.Xue & R.M.K.Saunders

References

External Links 
 

Annonaceae genera
Annonaceae